is a combat flight simulator video game created by Gaijin Entertainment and published by Konami. It was released on March 13, 2012 for PlayStation 3 and Xbox 360. The game includes more than one hundred non-fictional planes, twenty historical missions, and hundreds of procedural missions over sixteen different locations, including Pearl Harbor and Wake Island.  It has single player, four player cooperative, and online multiplayer modes. Birds of Steel provided the base work for Gaijin Entertainment's MMO game War Thunder.

Reception

IGN rated the Xbox 360 version of the game an 8.5 out of 10, praising the graphics, sound, gameplay and lasting appeal but saying that the presentation lacked a little spark.  Official PlayStation Magazine rated the PS3 version of the game 7 out of 10. The game consists of three difficulty settings, which change the way planes are flown: Simplified, an arcade play style, Realistic, a mix between an arcade play style and a simulation play style, and lastly Simulator, in which the planes handle as closely to real life as possible. A.I. difficulty is not affected by the selected play style.

References

External links
 

2012 video games
Konami games
Pacific War video games
PlayStation 3 games
Video games developed in Russia
Video games set in Germany
Video games set in Hawaii
Video games set in Malta
Video games set in Papua New Guinea
Video games set in Russia
Video games set in the Solomon Islands
Video games set in the Soviet Union
Video games set in Ukraine
Video games set in the United Kingdom
Video games set in the United States
Video games set in the 20th century
World War II flight simulation video games
Xbox 360 games
Gaijin Entertainment games
Multiplayer and single-player video games